Serhiy Mykolayovych Shevchuk (born 18 June 1985) is a professional Ukrainian football midfielder who plays for Juniors Shpytky.

Club career
On 9 January 2019, Shevchuk joined Armenian club FC Pyunik on loan from FC Tambov until the end of the 2018–19 season.

On 6 June 2019, after being released by Tambov, Shevchuk signed a permanent contract with Pyunik.

References

External links
 Official Website Profile 
 
 

1985 births
Living people
Ukrainian footballers
Ukraine under-21 international footballers
FC Shakhtar Donetsk players
FC Shakhtar-2 Donetsk players
FC Shakhtar-3 Donetsk players
FC Zorya Luhansk players
FC Mariupol players
Ukrainian Premier League players
Armenian Premier League players
Expatriate footballers in Russia
FC Sokol Saratov players
FC Pyunik players
Ukrainian expatriate footballers
Expatriate footballers in Armenia
Association football midfielders
FC Tambov players
Sportspeople from Kyiv Oblast